Andrea I Muzaka, Ndrea Muzaka (also Andrew Musachi died 1319) was an Albanian prince of the Muzaka family and the ruler of the Principality of Berat.

Life

Andrea Muzaka came from the Muzaka noble family, who were wealthy in southern Albania. In 1279, his relative Gjon Muzaka, as an ally of the Byzantine emperor Michael VIII Palaiologos, fought the expansionist efforts of Charles I, who in 1272 founded the Regnum Albaniae ("Kingdom of Albania") in 1272 around the important port city of Durrës (Dyrrhachion). Andrea Muzaka de facto became vassal of Charles, who awarded him the title "Marshal of Albania" 

After the Anjou were largely expelled from Albania (1281) by a coalition of Byzantines and local Albanian forces, Andrea Muzaka established a de facto independent territorial rule, which later included the Myzeqe area west of Berat between the Devoll and the Vjosa. Since he had the high Byzantine court title of Sebastokrator, he was apparently formally recognized by Emperor Andronikos II as governor of Central Albania. In alliance with the Byzantines, Muzaka also withstood the Serbs who, under King Stefan Uroš II Milutin, attacked Albania from the north. From 1335, his grandson Andrea II significantly expanded the rule of the family in Central Albania

Descendants

Andrea I. had two sons:

Teodor I Muzaka, Protosebastos lived in the late 13th / early 14th century, (called long hair)

Mentulo or Matarango, Count of Clissania

References

1319 deaths
13th-century Albanian people